The highest specific impulse chemical rockets use liquid propellants (liquid-propellant rockets). They can consist of a single chemical (a monopropellant) or a mix of two chemicals, called bipropellants. Bipropellants can further be divided into two categories; hypergolic propellants, which ignite when the fuel and oxidizer make contact, and non-hypergolic propellants which require an ignition source.

About 170 different propellants made of liquid fuel have been tested, excluding minor changes to a specific propellant such as propellant additives, corrosion inhibitors, or stabilizers. In the U.S. alone at least 25 different propellant combinations have been flown.

Many factors go into choosing a propellant for a liquid-propellant rocket engine. The primary factors include ease of operation, cost, hazards/environment and performance.

History

Development in early 20th century
Konstantin Tsiolkovsky proposed the use of liquid propellants in 1903, in his article Exploration of Outer Space by Means of Rocket Devices.

On March 16, 1926, Robert H. Goddard used liquid oxygen (LOX) and gasoline as rocket fuels for his first partially successful liquid-propellant rocket launch. Both propellants are readily available, cheap and highly energetic. Oxygen is a moderate cryogen as air will not liquefy against a liquid oxygen tank, so it is possible to store LOX briefly in a rocket without excessive insulation.

 In Germany, engineers and scientists became enthralled with liquid propulsion, building and testing them in the late 1920s within Opel RAK in Rüsselsheim. According to Max Valier's account, Opel RAK rocket designer, Friedrich Wilhelm Sander launched two liquid-fuel rockets at Opel Rennbahn in Rüsselsheim on April 10 and April 12, 1929. These Opel RAK rockets have been the first European, and after Goddard the world's second, liquid-fuel rockets in history. In his book “Raketenfahrt” Valier describes the size of the rockets as of 21 cm in diameter and with a length of 74 cm, weighing 7 kg empty and 16 kg with fuel. The maximum thrust was 45 to 50 kp, with a total burning time of 132 seconds. These properties indicate a gas pressure pumping. The first missile rose so quickly that Sander lost sight of it. Two days later, a second unit was ready to go, Sander tied a 4,000-meter-long rope to the rocket. After 2000 m or rope had been unwound, the line broke and this rocket also disappeared in the area, probably near the Opel proving ground and racetrack in Rüsselsheim, the "Rennbahn". The main purpose of these tests was to develop the propulsion system for the aircraft for crossing the English channel. Also spaceflight historian Frank H. Winter, curator at National Air and Space Museum in Washington, DC, confirms the Opel group was working, in addition to their solid-fuel rockets used for land-speed records and the world's first manned rocket-plane flights, on liquid-fuel rockets (SPACEFLIGHT, Vol. 21,2, Feb. 1979): In a cabled exclusive to The New York Times on 30 September 1929, Fritz von Opel is quoted as saying: "Sander and I now want to transfer the liquid rocket from the laboratory to practical use. With the liquid rocket I hope to be the first man to thus fly across the English Channel. I will not rest until I have accomplished that." At a speech on the donation of a RAK 2 replica to the Deutsches Museum, von Opel mentioned also Opel engineer Josef Schaberger as a key collaborator. "He belonged," von Opel said, "with the same enthusiasm as Sander to our small secret group, one of the tasks of which was to hide all the preparations from my father, because his paternal apprehensions led him to believe that I was cut out for something better than being a rocket researchist. Schaberger supervised all the details involved in construction and assembly (of rocket cars), and every time I sat behind the wheel with a few hundred pounds of explosives in my rear, and made the first contact, I did so with a feeling of total security [...] As early as 1928, Mr. Schaberger and I developed a liquid rocket, which was definitely the first permanently operating rocket in which the explosive was injected into the combustion chamber and simultaneously cooled using pumps. [...] We used benzol as the fuel," von Opel continued, "and nitrogen tetroxide as the oxidizer. This rocket was installed in a Mueller-Griessheim aircraft and developed a thrust of 70 kg (154 lb.)." By May 1929, the engine produced a thrust of 200 kg (440 lb.) "for longer than fifteen minutes and in July 1929, the Opel RAK collaborators were able to attain powered phases of more than thirty minutes for thrusts of 300 kg (660-lb.) at Opel's works in Rüsselsheim," again according to Max Valier's account. The Great Depression brought an end to the Opel RAK activities. Valier's, who died while experimenting in 1930, and Sander's work on liquid-fuel rockets was confiscated by the German military, the Heereswaffenamt and integrated into the activities under General Walter Dornberger in the early and mid-1930s in a field near Berlin. An amateur rocket group, the VfR, co-founded by Max Valier, included Wernher von Braun, who eventually became the head of the army research station that designed the V-2 rocket weapon for the Nazis. Sander was arrested by Gestapo in 1935, when private rocket-engineering became forbidden in Germany, was convicted of treason to 5 years in prison and forced to sell his company, he died in 1938.

World War II era

Germany had very active rocket development before and during World War II, both for the strategic V-2 rocket and other missiles. The V-2 used an alcohol/LOX liquid-propellant engine, with hydrogen peroxide to drive the fuel pumps. The alcohol was mixed with water for engine cooling. Both Germany and the United States developed reusable liquid-propellant rocket engines that used a storeable liquid oxidizer with much greater density than LOX and a liquid fuel that ignited spontaneously on contact with the high density oxidizer. The major manufacturer of German rocket engines for military use, the HWK firm, manufactured the RLM-numbered 109-500-designation series of rocket engine systems, and either used hydrogen peroxide as a monopropellant for Starthilfe rocket-propulsive assisted takeoff needs; or as a form of thrust for MCLOS-guided air-sea glide bombs; and used in a bipropellant combination of the same oxidizer with a fuel mixture of hydrazine hydrate and methyl alcohol for rocket engine systems intended for manned combat aircraft propulsion purposes. The U.S. engine designs were fueled with the bipropellant combination of nitric acid as the oxidizer; and aniline as the fuel. Both engines were used to power aircraft, the Me 163 Komet interceptor in the case of the Walter 509-series German engine designs, and RATO units from both nations (as with the Starthilfe system for the Luftwaffe) to assist take-off of aircraft, which comprised the primary purpose for the case of the U.S. liquid-fueled rocket engine technology - much of it coming from the mind of U.S. Navy officer Robert Truax.

1950s and 1960s

During the 1950s and 1960s there was a great burst of activity by propellant chemists to find high-energy liquid and solid propellants better suited to the military. Large strategic missiles need to sit in land-based or submarine-based silos for many years, able to launch at a moment's notice. Propellants requiring continuous refrigeration, which cause their rockets to grow ever-thicker blankets of ice, were not practical. As the military was willing to handle and use hazardous materials, a great number of dangerous chemicals were brewed up in large batches, most of which wound up being deemed unsuitable for operational systems.  In the case of nitric acid, the acid itself was unstable, and corroded most metals, making it difficult to store. The addition of a modest amount of nitrogen tetroxide, turned the mixture red and kept it from changing composition, but left the problem that nitric acid corrodes containers it is placed in, releasing gases that can build up pressure in the process. The breakthrough was the addition of a little hydrogen fluoride (HF), which forms a self-sealing metal fluoride on the interior of tank walls that Inhibited Red Fuming Nitric Acid. This made "IRFNA" storeable. Propellant combinations based on IRFNA or pure  as oxidizer and kerosene or hypergolic (self igniting) aniline, hydrazine or unsymmetrical dimethylhydrazine (UDMH) as fuel were then adopted in the United States and the Soviet Union for use in strategic and tactical missiles. The self-igniting storeable liquid bi-propellants have somewhat lower specific impulse than LOX/kerosene but have higher density so a greater mass of propellant can be placed in the same sized tanks. Gasoline was replaced by different hydrocarbon fuels, for example RP-1 a highly refined grade of kerosene. This combination is quite practical for rockets that need not be stored.

Kerosene

The V-2 rockets developed by Nazi Germany used LOX and ethyl alcohol. One of the main advantages of alcohol was its water content which provided cooling in larger rocket engines. Petroleum-based fuels offered more power than alcohol, but standard gasoline and kerosene left too much silt and combustion by-products that could clog engine plumbing. In addition they lacked the cooling properties of ethyl alcohol.

During the early 1950s, the chemical industry in the US was assigned the task of formulating an improved petroleum-based rocket propellant which would not leave residue behind and also ensure that the engines would remain cool. The result was RP-1, the specifications of which were finalized by 1954. A highly refined form of jet fuel, RP-1 burned much more cleanly than conventional petroleum fuels and also posed less of a danger to ground personnel from explosive vapours. It became the propellant for most of the early American rockets and ballistic missiles such as the Atlas, Titan I, and Thor. The Soviets quickly adopted RP-1 for their R-7 missile, but the majority of Soviet launch vehicles ultimately used storable hypergolic propellants. , it is used in the first stages of many orbital launchers.

Hydrogen
Many early rocket theorists believed that hydrogen would be a marvelous propellant, since it gives the highest specific impulse. It is also considered the cleanest when oxidized with oxygen because the only by-product is water. Steam reforming of natural gas is the most common method of producing commercial bulk hydrogen at about 95% of the world production of 500 billion m3 in 1998. At high temperatures (700–1100 °C) and in the presence of a metal-based catalyst (nickel), steam reacts with methane to yield carbon monoxide and hydrogen.

Hydrogen in any state is very bulky; it is typically stored as a deeply cryogenic liquid, a technique mastered in the early 1950s as part of the hydrogen bomb development program at Los Alamos. Liquid hydrogen is stored and transported without boil-off, because helium, which has a lower boiling point than hydrogen, acts as cooling refrigerant. Only when hydrogen is loaded on a launch vehicle, where no refrigeration exists, it vents to the atmosphere.

In the late 1950s and early 1960s it was adopted for hydrogen-fuelled stages such as Centaur and Saturn upper stages. Even as a liquid, hydrogen has low density, requiring large tanks and pumps, and the extreme cold requires tank insulation. This extra weight reduces the mass fraction of the stage or requires extraordinary measures such as pressure stabilization of the tanks to reduce weight. Pressure stabilized tanks support most of the loads with internal pressure rather than with solid structures, employing primarily the tensile strength of the tank material.

The Soviet rocket programme, in part due to a lack of technical capabilities, did not use  as a propellant until the 1980s when it was used for the Energia core stage.

Upper stage use
The liquid-rocket engine propellant combination of liquid oxygen and hydrogen offers the highest specific impulse of currently used conventional rockets. This extra performance largely offsets the disadvantage of low density. Low density of a propellant leads to larger fuel tanks. However, a small increase in specific impulse in an upper stage application can have a significant increase in payload to orbit capability.

Comparison to kerosene

Launch pad fires due to spilled kerosene are more damaging than hydrogen fires, primarily for two reasons. First, kerosene burns about 20% hotter in absolute temperature than hydrogen. The second reason is its buoyancy. Since hydrogen is a deep cryogen it boils quickly and rises due to its very low density as a gas. Even when hydrogen burns, the gaseous  that is formed has a molecular weight of only 18 u compared to 29.9 u for air, so it rises quickly as well. Kerosene on the other hand falls to the ground and burns for hours when spilled in large quantities, unavoidably causing extensive heat damage that requires time-consuming repairs and rebuilding. This is a lesson most frequently experienced by test stand crews involved with firings of large, unproven rocket engines. Hydrogen-fuelled engines have special design requirements such as running propellant lines horizontally, so traps do not form in the lines and cause ruptures due to boiling in confined spaces. These considerations apply to all cryogens, such as liquid oxygen and liquid natural gas (LNG) as well. Use of liquid hydrogen fuel has an excellent safety record and superb performance that is well above that of all other practical chemical rocket propellants.

Lithium and fluorine
The highest specific impulse chemistry ever test-fired in a rocket engine was lithium and fluorine, with hydrogen added to improve the exhaust thermodynamics (all propellants had to be kept in their own tanks, making this a tripropellant). The combination delivered 542 s specific impulse in a vacuum, equivalent to an exhaust velocity of 5320 m/s. The impracticality of this chemistry highlights why exotic propellants are not actually used: to make all three components liquids, the hydrogen must be kept below –252 °C (just 21 K) and the lithium must be kept above 180 °C (453 K). Lithium and fluorine are both extremely corrosive, lithium ignites on contact with air, fluorine ignites on contact with most fuels, including hydrogen. Fluorine and the hydrogen fluoride (HF) in the exhaust are very toxic, which makes working around the launch pad difficult, damages the environment, and makes getting a launch license that much more difficult. Both lithium and fluorine are expensive compared to most rocket propellants. This combination has therefore never flown.

During the 1950s, the Department of Defense initially proposed lithium/fluorine as ballistic missile propellants. A 1954 accident at a chemical works where a cloud of fluorine was released into the atmosphere convinced them to instead use LOX/RP-1.

Methane
Liquid methane has a lower specific impulse than liquid hydrogen, but is easier to store due to its higher boiling point and density, as well as its lack of hydrogen embrittlement. It also leaves less residue in the engines compared to kerosene, which is beneficial for reusability. In addition, it can be produced on Mars via the Sabatier reaction. In NASA's Mars Design Reference Mission 5.0 documents (between 2009 and 2012), liquid methane/LOX (methalox) was the chosen propellant mixture for the lander module.

, no methane-fueled rocket has reached orbit, although several rockets are in development and Zhuque-2 had one failed orbital launch attempt.

SpaceX developed the Raptor engine for its Starship super-heavy-lift launch vehicle. It has been used in test flights from 2019 to 2021. SpaceX had previously used only RP-1/LOX in their engines. 

Blue Origin and United Launch Alliance developed the BE-4 LOX/LNG engine for Vulcan Centaur and New Glenn. The BE-4 will provide  of thrust.

In July 2014, Firefly Space Systems announced their plans to use methane fuel for their small satellite launch vehicle, Firefly Alpha with an aerospike engine design.

LandSpace developed the TQ-12 engine for its Zhuque-2 rocket. Relativity Space developed the Aeon 1 engine for its Terran 1 rocket.

Monopropellants

High-test peroxide High test peroxide is concentrated Hydrogen peroxide, with around 2% to 30% water. It decomposes to steam and oxygen when passed over a catalyst. This was historically used for reaction control systems, due to being easily storable. It is often used to drive Turbopumps, being used on the V2 rocket, and modern Soyuz. 
Hydrazine decomposes energetically to nitrogen, hydrogen, and ammonia (2N2H4 → N2+H2+2NH3) and is the most widely used in space vehicles. (Non-oxidized ammonia decomposition is endothermic and would decrease performance). 
Nitrous oxide decomposes to nitrogen and oxygen.
Steam when externally heated gives a reasonably modest Isp of up to 190 seconds, depending on material corrosion and thermal limits.

Present use

, liquid fuel combinations in common use:

Kerosene (RP-1) / liquid oxygen (LOX) Used for the lower stages of the Soyuz boosters, the first stages of Saturn V and the Atlas family, and both stages of  Electron and Falcon 9. Very similar to Robert Goddard's first rocket.
Liquid hydrogen (LH) / LOX Used in the stages of the Space Shuttle, Space Launch System, Ariane 5, Delta IV, New Shepard, H-IIB, GSLV and Centaur.
Unsymmetrical dimethylhydrazine (UDMH) or monomethylhydrazine (MMH) / dinitrogen tetroxide (NTO or ) Used in three first stages of the Russian Proton booster, Indian Vikas engine for PSLV and GSLV rockets, most Chinese boosters, a number of military, orbital and deep space rockets, as this fuel combination is hypergolic and storable for long periods at reasonable temperatures and pressures.
Hydrazine Used in deep space missions because it is storable and hypergolic, and can be used as a monopropellant with a catalyst.
Aerozine-50 (50/50 hydrazine and UDMH) Used in deep space missions because it is storable and hypergolic, and can be used as a monopropellant with a catalyst.

Table

The table uses data from the JANNAF thermochemical tables (Joint Army-Navy-NASA-Air Force (JANNAF) Interagency Propulsion Committee) throughout, with best-possible specific impulse calculated by Rocketdyne under the assumptions of adiabatic combustion, isentropic expansion, one-dimensional expansion and shifting equilibrium. Some units have been converted to metric, but pressures have not.

Definitions
Ve Average exhaust velocity, m/s. The same measure as specific impulse in different units, numerically equal to specific impulse in N·s/kg.
r Mixture ratio: mass oxidizer / mass fuel
Tc Chamber temperature, °C
d Bulk density of fuel and oxidizer, g/cm3
C* Characteristic velocity, m/s. Equal to chamber pressure multiplied by throat area, divided by mass flow rate. Used to check experimental rocket's combustion efficiency.

Bipropellants

Definitions of some of the mixtures:

IRFNA IIIa 83.4% HNO3, 14% NO2, 2% H2O, 0.6% HF
IRFNA IV HDA 54.3% HNO3, 44% NO2, 1% H2O, 0.7% HF
RP-1 See MIL-P-25576C, basically kerosene (approximately )
MMH monomethylhydrazine 

Has not all data for CO/O, purposed for NASA for Martian-based rockets, only a specific impulse about 250 s.

r Mixture ratio: mass oxidizer / mass fuel
Ve Average exhaust velocity, m/s. The same measure as specific impulse in different units, numerically equal to specific impulse in N·s/kg.
C* Characteristic velocity, m/s. Equal to chamber pressure multiplied by throat area, divided by mass flow rate. Used to check experimental rocket's combustion efficiency.
Tc Chamber temperature, °C
d Bulk density of fuel and oxidizer, g/cm3

Monopropellants

References

External links
 Cpropep-Web an online computer program to calculate propellant performance in rocket engines
 Design Tool for Liquid Rocket Engine Thermodynamic Analysis is a computer program to predict the performance of the liquid-propellant rocket engines.
  for a history of liquid rocket propellants in the US by a pioneering rocket propellant developer.

Rocket propulsion
Rocket propellants

ja:ロケットエンジンの推進剤#液体燃料ロケット